Río Primero Department is a department of Córdoba Province in Argentina.

The provincial subdivision has a population of about 42,429 inhabitants in an area of 6,753 km², and its capital city is Santa Rosa de Río Primero.

Settlements
Atahona
Cañada de Machado
Capilla de los Remedios
Chalacea
Colonia Las Cuatro Esquinas
Comechingones
Diego de Rosas
El Crispín
Esquina
Kilómetro 658
La Para
La Posta
La Puerta
La Quinta
Las Gramillas
Las Saladas
Maquinista Gallini
Monte Cristo
Obispo Trejo
Piquillín
Plaza de Mercedes
Río Primero
Sagrada Familia
Santa Rosa de Río Primero
Villa Fontana

Departments of Córdoba Province, Argentina